Hlebine is a municipality in Koprivnica-Križevci County in Croatia. It consists of two villages, Hlebine and Gabajeva Greda.

Population

Its population is earns its living primarily from agricultural production. The population has been decreasing continuously for a number of years. As of 2001, Hlebine had 1470 inhabitants with the overwhelming majority being Croats.

History
Hlebine is first mentioned 1671 as a village in the Drnje parish. It became an independent parish in the 18th century. In the late 19th century and early 20th century, Hlebine was part of the Bjelovar-Križevci County of the Kingdom of Croatia-Slavonia. It was a part of Koprivnica county until 1993. Hlebine is also an important city for Croatian art, and is a center of Croatian naive art. It is a birth town of Franjo Mraz, Krsto Hegedušić, Ivan Generalić, Josip Generalić and Franjo Gaži. To Hlebine naive painting movement belonged also Mirko Virius, dead in camp at Zemun around 1943.

See also
 Hlebine School

Municipalities of Croatia
Populated places in Koprivnica-Križevci County